The Philadelphia Watch Case Company Building is located at  Pavilion and Lafayette Avenues near the Riverside station in Riverside Township of Burlington County, New Jersey. It was added to the National Register of Historic Places on January 31, 1978, for its significance in architecture, industry, and entertainment.

History
In 1852, Samuel Bechtold began constructing the oldest part of the building, the Pavilion Hotel. In 1892, Theophilus Zurbrugg, owner of
the Philadelphia Watch Case Company, purchased it. In 1906, the company started construction of the larger building, completed in 1908.

See also
 National Register of Historic Places listings in Burlington County, New Jersey

References

External links
 

Riverside Township, New Jersey
Buildings and structures in Burlington County, New Jersey
National Register of Historic Places in Burlington County, New Jersey
Industrial buildings and structures on the National Register of Historic Places in New Jersey
Industrial buildings completed in 1852
New Jersey Register of Historic Places